The Northeast Transportation Company is the operator of local bus service in the cities of Waterbury, Naugatuck, Meriden, and Wallingford, operating under contract to Connecticut Transit.

Waterbury routes
All routes originate from the Waterbury Green (Unless otherwise noted) and operate 365 days a year, including major holidays.

Former Routes

Naugatuck routes
Like its fellow town Bristol, Naugatuck has three local routes that run through the town, returning every 90 minutes. Weekdays only between 9:00 AM & 4:00 PM.

Meriden routes
In Meriden, five loop routes are operated between 6 AM and 6 PM, weekdays only. Connections are available at the Meriden Transit Center Monday through Saturday to New Haven via Route C1 (future Route 215M), at the Westfield Meriden Mall to New Britain via Route 501, and to Hartford in AM Rush Hour via Route 919 Express (operated by DATTCO).

Wallingford routes
The Wallingford Local is being split into two separate routes, both of which will start/end at Wallingford Center. Transfters are available to Route 215 (former Route C) between New Haven and Meriden. Weekdays only between 9:00 AM & 4:00 PM. Come Summer 2018, these routes may be revised to serve the CTrail/AMTRAK Wallingford RR Station.

See also
Connecticut Transit Hartford
Connecticut Transit New Britain and Bristol
Connecticut Transit New Haven
Connecticut Transit Stamford

All of the above provide CT Transit route service.

References

External links

Bus companies of the United States
Bus transportation in Connecticut
Surface transportation in Greater New York
Transportation in New Haven County, Connecticut
Waterbury, Connecticut
Transportation companies based in Connecticut